Kalm is a surname. Notable people with this surname include:

 Anu Kalm, Estonian graphic artist and illustrator
 Chet Kalm, American painter, teacher, and illustrator
 Hans Kalm, Estonian soldier who served in the armies of Russian Empire, Finland and Estonia
 Kaido Kalm, Estonian sledge hockey player
 Pehr Kalm, Finnish explorer, botanist, naturalist, and agricultural economist
 Volli Kalm, Estonian geologist and rector of the University of Tartu

Estonian-language surnames